Gordon Taylor Snyder, (December 17, 1924 – December 10, 2005) was the Minister of Labour of the Canadian province of Saskatchewan from 1971 to 1982, and a member of the Saskatchewan New Democratic Party (NDP).

Early years
His formative years, spanning the Great Depression, were divided between his family farm and Moose Jaw where his father worked as a railroad engineer and a respected union leader. Family discussions surrounded Christian responsibility to your fellow man and the works of prominent European social thinkers. Snyder was appalled at the injustice of an economic system, which left to its own devices, threw so many into despair and poverty, then quickly flourished when socially unproductive items like tanks, guns, and bombs were built. This view that society should serve all its citizens, not just the wealthy and powerful, led Snyder and his parents to become some of the earliest members of the Co-operative Commonwealth Federation party which later became the NDP.

In 1942, Snyder jointed the Royal Canadian Air Force, serving Canada until his discharge at the end of World War II in 1945. He then returned home to take up a career as a railroad engineer, operate the family farm and actively participate in community affairs.

Political career
Snyder's commitment to the development of a just society led him to seek and win office in the 1960 provincial election under the leadership of T. C. Douglas. In 1962, he was a "proud foot soldier" in the fight that brought universal Medicare to Saskatchewan, and ultimately led to its adoption across Canada.

Subsequent election wins in 1964, 1971, 1975 and 1978 made Snyder one of Saskatchewan’s longest serving MLAs with a total of 22 years in the legislature. His 1971-1982 appointment by Premier Allan Blakeney to the Provincial Cabinet as Minister of Labour provided the opportunity to develop legislation which reflected Saskatchewan values of fairness, dignity and equality. Snyder was the only labour minister for the entire duration of the Blakeney government from 1971-82. Typically, ministers serve a maximum of three to four years in a portfolio - eleven years is almost unheard of
.

Most often a particular minister will want a change of scenery after a few years on the job or they will start to hit roadblocks with stakeholder groups and the premier will decide it is time to try someone new. Neither was ever the case for Snyder.

As a cabinet minister, his favourite legislative accomplishment was the development of a Canadian first, the Occupational Health and Safety Act, which, since its implementation, has served to protect the lives and health of a great many people from workplace related accidents and illness. Another Canadian first, the introduction of the forty-hour work week was also made during his tenure as head of the Department of Labour. Snyder also undertook the complete revamping of workers' compensation in Saskatchewan changing it from a system that saw the government pay out lump sums for permanent injuries to one that was based on income replacement with the focus on rehabilitation.

Snyder retired from public life after the defeat of the provincial NDP government in the 1982 election.

References

Snyder, Gordon Taylor
Snyder, Gordon Taylor
Snyder, Gordon Taylor
Snyder, Gordon Taylor
Saskatchewan New Democratic Party MLAs
Members of the Executive Council of Saskatchewan